Wikstroemia indica, also known as tie bush, Indian stringbush, bootlace bush, or small-leaf salago is a small shrub with glossy leaves, small greenish-yellow flowers and toxic red fruits.  It grows in forests and on rocky, shrubby slopes in central and southeastern China, Vietnam, India, Australia and the Philippines.

Toxicity
W. indica is toxic and the poisoning caused by W. indica leads to dizziness, blurred vision, nausea, vomiting, abdominal distension, abdominal pain and diarrhea.

Medicinal uses
It is one of the 50 fundamental herbs used in traditional Chinese medicine.  As a traditional Chinese herb, this plant has long been employed as an antipyretic, detoxicant, expectorant, vermifuge, and abortifacient in clinical practice in China.

Chemicals
An alcoholic extract of the plant was found to contain daphnoretin, chrysophanol, myricitrime and rutin. The extract of W. indica displays antimicrobial and anti-inflammatory activities in vitro.

Gallery

References

indica
Medicinal plants
Plants used in traditional Chinese medicine